Leidy Klotz (born July 14, 1978) is an American scientist and author who studies and writes about design and problem-solving. He is a professor of engineering and architecture at the University of Virginia. Klotz has published in scientific journals including Nature and Science and in other publications such as The Washington Post, Harvard Business Review, Fast Company, and The Globe and Mail. He is also the author of two popular books: Subtract: The Untapped Science of Less (2021), which discusses design and problem-solving, and Sustainability through Soccer (2016), a work about systems thinking.

Klotz is a retired United Soccer League soccer player.

Soccer career 

Klotz played professionally for the Pittsburgh Riverhounds, making 31 appearances and scoring 3 goals in the 2000 and 2001 seasons. Klotz was a 2x Division I All-American at Lafayette College. He was inducted into the Lafayette College Hall of Fame in 2016 and the Homer High School Hall of Fame in 2009.

Scientific career 
Klotz is currently a Professor of Engineering and Architecture at the University of Virginia. He studies and teaches the science of design, and, in 2019, co-chaired a Nature Sustainability Expert Panel on this topic. He has published articles in Nature and Science and, as of 2022, has an h-index of 24. His research has been covered by The Washington Post, The Wall Street Journal, The World Economic Forum, Grist, Scientific American, and newspapers around the world.

Books 
SUBTRACT: The Untapped Science of Less (Flatiron Books, 2021). Subtract is recognized as an essential read in behavioral science, design, environmental, business, well-being, and education. The book builds from Klotz's research showing that the human mind tends to add before taking away, even to our detriment. The first half of the book discusses biological, cultural, and socio-economic explanations for this tendency. The second half of the book offers ways to overcome harmful subtraction neglect, drawing from science and from subtracting examples and exemplars such as: Maya Lin, Elinor Ostrom, The Embarcadero Freeway, Balance Bikes, Anna Keichline, and Bruce Springsteen. 

Sustainability through Soccer (University of California Press, 2016).

Notable research articles 

 "People Systematically Overlook Subtractive Changes." Nature. 592. 258–261. Adams, G., Converse, B., Hales, A., and Klotz, L. (2021)
 "Embracing Behavioral Science." The Bridge - National Academy of Engineering. 50 (4). Klotz, L., and Pickering, J. (2020)
 “Beyond rationality in engineering design for sustainability.” Nature Sustainability. 1: 225–233. Klotz, L., Weber, E., Johnson, E., Shealy, E., Hernandez, M., and Gordon, B. (2018)
 “Sustainability as a route to broaden participation in engineering.” Journal of Engineering Education, 103(1): 137–153. Klotz, L., et al. (2014).
 “A framework for sustainable whole systems design.” Design Studies. 33(5) 456–479. Blizzard, J., and Klotz, L. (2012).

Science communication 
Klotz writes about research and design for popular outlets such as The Washington Post, Fast Company, and Harvard Business Review.

Klotz frequently appears on top science podcasts and radio shows such as Freakonomics Radio, Mindscape with Sean Carroll, the Michael Shermer Show, and PRI The World.

References

External links
 Audio Interview
 

American male non-fiction writers
American soccer players
University of Virginia faculty
Association football midfielders
Living people
1978 births
American scientists